The Reunion Society of Vermont Officers was an organization of American Civil War veterans.

Founding
The Society was founded in 1864 by Union veterans from Vermont.  Its original organizers included Redfield Proctor, George G. Benedict, and Wheelock G. Veazey.

Membership
Membership was open to Union officer and noncommissioned officer veterans of the United States Army and Navy from Vermont and Union veterans who were natives of Vermont.

Purpose
According to its constitution, the Reunion Society of Vermont Officers was founded to: create and sustain fraternal ties among Civil War veterans; record recollections of fallen comrades; recall and memorialize the events of the war; and remember and promote to succeeding generations the ideals of liberty and national honor which prompted members to fight in the Civil War.

Activities
The Society met annually in the House of Representatives chamber of the Vermont State House to hear an oration on a historical Civil War-related topic.  In addition, the group conducted an annual reunion, at different cities in the state, at which it elected officers for the upcoming year.

On two occasions during its existence the Society published the records of its annual proceedings, which included the text of its annual historical orations.

The Reunion Society also endeavored to collect images of every Vermonter who served as an officer in the Civil War, ultimately obtaining 859 photos of the 1363 officers, or 63%.

Prominent members
Almost all prominent Vermonters who had served in the Civil War were members of the Society, including U.S. Senator Redfield Proctor, Interstate Commerce Commission member Wheelock G. Veazey, and Governors Peter T. Washburn, Roswell Farnham, John L. Barstow, Samuel E. Pingree, Ebenezer J. Ormsbee, Urban A. Woodbury, Josiah Grout, and Charles J. Bell.

Political influence
Vermont elected only Republicans to statewide office from the party's founding in the 1850s through the 1960s, a legacy largely possible in the second half of the 19th century because of the party's support among Union veterans.
Among the earliest members who were prominent in government were Redfield Proctor and Wheelock G. Veazey, who used loyalty among Civil War veterans as a base of political support to attain prominence in the Republican Party.

One of the Vermont Republican party's devices for maintaining order and avoiding primary elections was to restrict governors to two one-year terms.  When two-year terms were introduced, the party limited governors to a single term.  Another party device was the "Mountain Rule".  Under the provisions of the Mountain Rule, one U.S. Senator was a resident of the east side of the Green Mountains and one resided on the west side, and the governorship and lieutenant governorship alternated between residents of the east and west side.  These provisions were made possible in large part because members of the Reunion Society who were likely candidates for office agreed to abide by them in the interests of party unity.

Termination of activity
Membership in the society dwindled as Union veterans aged and died, but it remained active at least until 1915.

Partial list of presidents and years of election

Resources

References

American Civil War veterans and descendants organizations
Organizations based in Vermont
Vermont in the American Civil War
Organizations established in 1864